Pimenta Bueno is a municipality located in the Brazilian state of Rondônia. Its population was 36,881 (2020) and its area is 6,241 km².

The municipality contained the  Rio Roosevelt State Forest, created in 1990 and cancelled in 2010.

The city is served by Pimenta Bueno Airport.

References

Municipalities in Rondônia